Ionuț Alexandru Dobroiu (born 24 February 1988, București) is a Romanian former professional footballer who played as a forward.

Career
Ionuț Dobroiu was born on 24 February 1988 in Bucharest and his first sport practiced was athletics at the age of 7, winning major junior Romanian national competitions. He started playing football at Rapid București, making his Divizia A debut on 12 August 2007 for the club when coach Cristiano Bergodi used him in a 2–1 away victory against Universitatea Cluj. He scored his only Divizia A goal in a 2–0 home victory against Universitatea Craiova. Dobroiu was known for his speed, at a point reaching 5.2 seconds in a 50 metres sprint but also for his lack of discipline.

Conviction
Ionuț Dobroiu was sentenced in 2018 to a jail term of three years and 11 months for continuous high risk drug trafficking, formation of an organized criminal group, possession and consumption of high risk drugs. He executed his term at the Rahova penitentiary, being in the same cell with former footballer Răzvan Pădurețu and former Politehnica Timișoara owner, Marian Iancu. Dobroiu was released after two years and four months spent in jail.

References

External links

1988 births
Living people
Romanian footballers
Romania under-21 international footballers
FC Rapid București players
SCM Râmnicu Vâlcea players
Liga I players
Liga II players
Association football forwards
Footballers from Bucharest